Zilitene is a community located in the Zambezi Region of Namibia. As of 2006, Zilitene has a population of approximately 800 people within 167 households.  Zilitene also has a community forest.

Zilitene is east of Windhoek, the capital city of Namibia.

References

External links

Populated places in the Zambezi Region